Date with the Angels is an American sitcom that aired on ABC from May 10, 1957, to January 29, 1958. The series, which stars Betty White and Bill Williams, began as a late season replacement for The Ray Anthony Show for the same sponsor, Chrysler's Plymouth division. Tom Kennedy was the show's announcer and spokesman for Plymouth.

Synopsis
The series revolves around newly married Vicki Angel and her insurance salesman husband Gus Angel who get themselves and their friends and neighbors into various comedic situations. Besides Betty White and Bill Williams, the series also featured for several episodes Richard Deacon, Richard Reeves, Maudie Prickett and Burt Mustin. Tom Kennedy's voice also appeared as announcer at the end of episodes.

Among the series' guest stars were Nancy Kulp, Madge Blake, Joan Vohs, Chuck Connors, Reta Shaw, Dave Willock, Sid Melton, Russell Hicks, Hugh O'Brian, Hanley Stafford, and Willard Waterman.

The show's theme song was "Got A Date With An Angel", a semi-standard introduced in 1932 and long associated with the orchestra of Hal Kemp.

Date with the Angels was loosely based on the Elmer Rice play Dream Girl, and the series was originally intended to revolve heavily around Vicki's daydreaming tendencies, with more than half of a typical episode dedicated to fantasy sequences. However, the sponsor was not pleased with the fantasy elements and successfully exerted pressure to have them eliminated. "Without our dream sequences," White later said, "our show flattened out and became just one more run-of-the-mill domestic comedy[...]I can honestly say that was the only time I have ever wanted to get out of a show."

The series produced 33 filmed episodes before it was canceled in late January 1958. White fulfilled her series commitment by reviving her previous live variety/comedy show, The Betty White Show, for the rest of the season.

Cast

Episodes

References

External links

1957 American television series debuts
1958 American television series endings
1950s American sitcoms
American Broadcasting Company original programming
Black-and-white American television shows
English-language television shows
Television series by CBS Studios
Television series about marriage
Television series based on plays